The Norris Geyser Basin Museum, also known as Norris Museum, is one of a series of "trailside museums" in Yellowstone National Park designed by architect Herbert Maier in a style that has become known as National Park Service Rustic.  It is listed on the National Register of Historic Places, and is one of three parts of a National Historic Landmark, the Norris, Madison, and Fishing Bridge Museums, which were funded by Laura Spelman Rockefeller's grant of $118,000. Built 1929 - 1930, the Norris Museum is sited on a hill between the Porcelain Basin and the Back Basin of Norris Geyser Basin. Its central breezeway frames a view of the Porcelain Basin for arriving visitors.

The  by  museum consists of two rectangular sections divided by the breezeway, which is roofed by a prominent jerkinhead gable., framed in massive logs. The pavilions to either side are of shingle-coveredframe construction on a massive stone base. A stone and concrete terrace surrounds the building.

A nearby comfort station is included in the National Register nomination. It was probably built in the 1930s. With the construction of modern restroom facilities the one story log structure is now used as a bookstore operated by the Yellowstone Association.

The museum exhibits focus on geothermal geology, features of Norris Geyser and plant and animal life in thermal areas.

See also 
 Fishing Bridge Museum
 Madison Museum
 Old Faithful Museum of Thermal Activity

References

External links 
 Norris Geyser Basin Museum
 Norris Museum, Museum Building, North of Steamboat Geyser & southwest of Norris Junction, Norris Junction, Park, WY at the Historic American Buildings Survey (HABS)
 Norris Museum, Restrooms, Northwest of Steamboat Geyser & southeast of Museum, Norris Junction, Park, WY at HABS
 Norris, Madison and Fishing Bridge Museums National Historic Landmarks  at the Wyoming State Historic Preservation Office

1930 establishments in Wyoming
Buildings and structures completed in 1929
Buildings and structures in Yellowstone National Park in Wyoming
Historic American Buildings Survey in Wyoming
Log buildings and structures on the National Register of Historic Places in Wyoming
Museums in Park County, Wyoming
National Park Service rustic in Wyoming
National Register of Historic Places in Park County, Wyoming
National Register of Historic Places in Yellowstone National Park
Natural history museums in Wyoming
Park buildings and structures on the National Register of Historic Places in Wyoming
Visitor centers in the United States